Nehalem  is a city in Tillamook County, Oregon, United States. Incorporated in 1889, the city lies along the Nehalem River and Nehalem Bay near the Pacific Ocean. It is bisected by U.S. Route 101. The population was 355 at the 2020 census.

History
Nehalem was named for the Nehalem tribe of Native American Indians, also known as the Tillamook People, who traditionally inhabited the area. In the native Salishan languages, Nehalem means "place where people live"

The city of Nehalem was established by European Americans in the latter portion of the nineteenth century, rapidly thriving with logging, fishing, and shipping. As the Northwestern logging industry slowed during the twentieth century, the city's economy also cooled. The city used to stretch over the river on log planks, where a lumber mill cut logs that came down a railroad track on the Nehalem River. Wood pilings that held up this track can be found in the North Fork Nehalem River. On the front of Nehalem Elementary School is a facade which proclaims "Union High School" from when the area was less populated and could support its own Elementary and high schools. Currently there is an elementary school and a community pool/rec. center run by the North County Recreation District which hosts a number of classes including those for Tillamook Bay Community College.

For many decades the State highway officials in Oregon had seen the route that Highway 101 took through Wheeler and Nehalem as temporary for the highway. During that time, the long-term plan for the highway was to move it along the Nehalem Spit, offering a longer view of Nehalem Bay and the Pacific Ocean. When the plans for this change began to take shape in the late 1960s the community backlash from the two towns was so intense that officials decided to leave the highway in its existing layout.

Lying so close to sea level, the area suffers intermittent floods. A 1996 storm caused particular damage, to local dairy farms.

The Portland-based band Everclear has a song, "Nehalem", about life in the town, on its Sparkle and Fade album.

Nehalem was the location for the 2000 HGTV Dream Home Contest, which awarded a furnished home and an automobile.

Geography

The "business district" runs one block along Highway 101, parallel with the Nehalem River. Many of the buildings are raised to avoid flooding. Nehalem has one traffic signal.

Demographics

2010 census
As of the census of 2010, there were 271 people, 116 households, and 72 families residing in the city. The racial makeup of the city was 93.0% White, 0.4% Native American, 1.1% Asian, 3.0% from other races, and 2.6% from two or more races. Hispanic or Latino of any race were 5.9% of the population.

Of the City's 116 households, 20.7% had children under the age of 18 living with them, 46.6% were married couples living together, 11.2% had a female householder with no husband present, 4.3% had a male householder with no wife present, and 37.9% were non-families. 25.0% of all households were made up of individuals, and 10.4% had someone living alone who was 65 years of age or older. The average household size was 2.34 and the average family size was 2.78.

The median age in the city was 44.2 years. 16.2% of residents were under the age of 18; 10.3% were between the ages of 18 and 24; 24.3% were from 25 to 44; 27.6% were from 45 to 64; and 21.4% were 65 years of age or older. The gender makeup of the city was 47.2% male and 52.8% female.

2000 census
As of the census of 2000, there were 203 people, 84 households, and 58 families residing in the city. The population density was 860.6 people per square mile (326.6/km). There were 121 housing units at an average density of 513.0 per square mile (194.7/km). The racial makeup of the city was 98.03% White, and 1.97% from two or more races. Hispanic or Latino of any race were 1.48% of the population.

Of the City's 84 households, 25.0% had children under the age of 18 living with them, 56.0% were married couples living together, 10.7% had a female householder with no husband present, and 29.8% were non-families. 22.6% of all households were made up of individuals, and 9.5% had someone living alone who was 65 years of age or older. The average household size was 2.42 and the average family size was 2.88.

In the city, the population was spread out, with 25.1% under the age of 18, 4.4% from 18 to 24, 24.1% from 25 to 44, 24.1% from 45 to 64, and 22.2% who were 65 years of age or older. The median age was 42 years. For every 100 females, there were 107.1 males. For every 100 females age 18 and over, there were 94.9 males.

The median income for a household in the city was $40,250, and the median income for a family was $47,679. Males had a median income of $30,000 versus $27,813 for females. The per capita income for the city was $15,408. About 9.0% of families and 7.7% of the population were below the poverty line, including 5.5% of those under the age of 18 and 3.0% of those 65 or over.

References

External links
 Entry for Nehalem in the Oregon Blue Book
Nehalem profile from the Oregon Economic & Community Development Department

Cities in Oregon
Populated coastal places in Oregon
Cities in Tillamook County, Oregon
Port cities in Oregon
1889 establishments in Oregon
Populated places established in 1889
Logging communities in the United States